Cyclinella is a genus of bivalves belonging to the family Veneridae.

The species of this genus are found in Japan and America.

Species:

Cyclinella beteyensis 
Cyclinella falconensis 
Cyclinella harrisi 
Cyclinella jadisi 
Cyclinella producta 
Cyclinella subquadrata 
Cyclinella tenuis

References

Veneridae
Bivalve genera